Leiocithara apollinea is a species of sea snail, a marine gastropod mollusk in the family Mangeliidae.

Description
The length of the shell attains 5 mm, its diameter 1.75 mm.

This white shell is a scalate Leiocithara .It has an ovate fusiform shape and contains 5 whorls. It is principally conspicuous for its thickened longitudinal ribs, 9–10 in number on the body whorl. The interstices are quite smooth. One spiral keel alone, a little below the sutures, crosses the ribs at right angles, and at the point of junction bears a beaded point. The aperture is oblong and becomes narrower at its base. The outer lip is incrassate.

Distribution
This species occurs in the Gulf of Oman.

References

 Kilburn R.N. 1992. Turridae (Mollusca: Gastropoda) of southern Africa and Mozambique. Part 6. Subfamily Mangeliinae, section 1. Annals of the Natal Museum, 33: 461–575

External links
  Tucker, J.K. 2004 Catalog of recent and fossil turrids (Mollusca: Gastropoda). Zootaxa 682:1-1295.

apollinea
Gastropods described in 1904